was a Japanese basketball player. She competed in the women's tournament at the 1976 Summer Olympics.

References

1956 births
1980 deaths
Japanese women's basketball players
Olympic basketball players of Japan
Basketball players at the 1976 Summer Olympics
Sportspeople from Shiga Prefecture
Asian Games medalists in basketball
Asian Games bronze medalists for Japan
Basketball players at the 1978 Asian Games
Medalists at the 1978 Asian Games
20th-century Japanese women